Bärbel Höhn (born 4 May 1952) is a German politician for Alliance '90/The Greens. She was elected to the Bundestag in the 2005 national elections, after serving as State Minister of Agriculture of North Rhine-Westphalia from 1995 to 2005.

Early life and education
Born in Flensburg, Höhn attended the University of Kiel, majoring in mathematics and economics, and earned her Diplom in 1976. From 1978 to 1990 she was a research assistant at the University of Duisburg-Essen.

Political career
Höhn began her political career as an activist in a local initiative against air pollution and as a city councilor in her home town of Oberhausen. In 1985, she joined Alliance '90/The Greens, and gained a seat in the Landtag of North Rhine-Westphalia in 1990.

State Minister for Environment and Agriculture in North Rhine-Westphalia, 1995-2005
In the fifth cabinet of Johannes Rau, Höhn became Minister for Environment and Agriculture, serving in that position under Rau's successor Wolfgang Clement until 2005. In that capacity, she played a leadership role in Europe's response to the mad cow disease epidemic in 2001, improved consumer rights and promoted energy efficiency and renewable sources of energy. Höhn has long criticized the industrial production methods of German farmers.

Even before entering the German Bundestag, Höhn was a Green Party delegate to the Federal Convention for the purpose of electing the President of Germany in May 2004.

Member of the German Bundestag, 2005-2017
Höhn first became a member of the German Bundestag in the 2005 federal election. She first served as chairwoman of the Committee on Committee on Food, Agriculture and Consumer Protection from 2005 to 2006. Between 2006 and 2013, she was vice-chair of the Green Party's parliamentary group – then led by co-chairs Renate Künast and Fritz Kuhn (2005-2009) or Jürgen Trittin (2009-2013), respectively – and headed its working group on environmental, energy, transport, agricultural and consumer policy. From 2005, she was also deputy chairwoman of the German-Brazilian Parliamentary Friendship Group. Between 2009 and 2013, she was part of the Parliamentary Friendship Group for Relations with the Baltic States.

Following the 2013 federal elections, Höhn stated that agreeing to a coalition with Chancellor Angela Merkel would be a "kamikaze" act for the Green Party. Exploratory coalition talks with Merkel's Christian Democratic Union ended soon after, without results.

From 2014, Höhn served as chairwoman of the Committee on the Environment, Nature Conservation and Nuclear Safety. Having participated in various UN climate conferences, she was a regular speaker at international climate and energy conventions.

Only a few days before a trip to the 2014 United Nations Climate Change Conference in Lima, the Ecuadorian government banned a parliamentary delegation led by Höhn from entering the country. Höhn and her group had planned to visit the Yasuni National Park and meet with people opposed to drilling there.

In April 2016, Höhn announced that she would not stand in the 2017 federal elections but instead resign from active politics by the end of the parliamentary term.

Life after politics
Since November 2017, Höhn has been acting as unpaid Commissioner for Energy Reform in Africa for the Federal Ministry of Economic Cooperation and Development.

Other activities
 German Federal Environmental Foundation (DBU), Member of the Board of Trustees
 GLOBE Germany, Member of the Board
 German-Brazilian Society (DBG), Member of the Board of Trustees 
 German Council on Foreign Relations (DGAP), Chairwoman of the Study Group on Global Issues
 Development and Peace Foundation (SEF), Member of the Board of Trustees (2005-2009)
 ver.di, Member

References

External links

 Official website
 Biography at the Bundestag
 BILD.DE vom 22.09.2011: "Peinlicher Auftritt von Grünen-Politikerin Bärbel Höhn (59) gestern bei „Anne Will"!"

1952 births
Living people
German economists
University of Kiel alumni
Members of the Landtag of North Rhine-Westphalia
Members of the Bundestag for North Rhine-Westphalia
Female members of the Bundestag
People from Flensburg
21st-century German women politicians
Members of the Bundestag 2013–2017
Members of the Bundestag 2009–2013
Members of the Bundestag 2005–2009
Members of the Bundestag for Alliance 90/The Greens